The  is an archipelago in the Nansei Islands, and are part of the Satsunan Islands, which is in turn part of the Ryukyu Archipelago. The  chain consists of twelve small islands located between Yakushima and Amami-Oshima. Administratively, the whole group belongs to Toshima Village, Kagoshima Prefecture, Japan. Only seven of the islands are permanently inhabited. The islands, especially Takarajima, are home to the Tokara Pony.

Etymology 
One theory holds that the name “Tokara” was derived from “tohara”, or “distant sea area” (沖の海原), as viewed from Okinawa. Another theory states that the name come from the Ainu word tokap, which means “breast”. The southernmost inhabited island in the archipelago, Takarajima, has a mountain  with such a shape.

History
(While an entry in the earlier Nihon Shoki for the year 654 mentions a "Tokara Country" 吐火罗国, Tokara no kuni, it is a reference to the Tokhara region of Central Asia,  rather than the Tokara Islands.) During the 15th and 16th centuries, the islands came under the control of the Shimazu clan of Satsuma Domain and the Ryukyu Kingdom. Ryukyu ceded its territory in the Tokara Islands to Satsuma in 1611, which was confirmed by the Tokugawa Shogunate in 1624.

In 1908, the islands were administratively organized into , of which seven were inhabited.  After World War II, from 2 February 1946 all of the Satsunan islands south of 30th Latitude, including the Tokara Islands, were placed under United States military administration as part of the Provisional Government of Northern Ryukyu Islands. However, the three northern inhabited islands in the archipelago, Iōjima, Kuroshima and Takeshima, remained under the control of Japan, and were placed under the administration of the village of Mishima. The remaining Tokara Islands reverted to Japan on 10 February 1952 and are now administered as the village of Toshima.

Important Bird Area
The islands have been recognised as an Important Bird Area (IBA) by BirdLife International because they support populations of Japanese wood pigeons, Ryukyu green pigeons, Ijima's leaf-warblers, Izu thrushes and Ryukyu robins.

Islands

References
National Geospatial Intelligence Agency (NGIA). Prostar Sailing Directions 2005 Japan Enroute. Prostar Publications (2005).

External links

 
 Official website in Japanese 
 Topographic Map 1:250.000

 
Islands of Kagoshima Prefecture
Archipelagoes of Japan
Satsunan Islands
Archipelagoes of the Pacific Ocean
Important Bird Areas of the Nansei Islands